Lasallian educational institutions are educational institutions affiliated with the De La Salle Brothers, a Roman Catholic religious teaching order founded by French priest Saint Jean-Baptiste de La Salle, who was canonized in 1900 and proclaimed by Pope Pius XII as patron saint of all teachers of youth on May 15, 1950. In regard to their educational activities the Brothers have since 1680 also called themselves "Brothers of the Christian Schools", associated with the Institute of the Brothers of the Christian Schools; they are often referred to by themselves and others by the shorter term "Christian Brothers", a name also applied to the unrelated Congregation of Christian Brothers or Irish Christian Brothers, also providers of education, which commonly causes confusion.

In 2021 the International Lasallian Mission Web site stated that the Lasallian order consists of about 3,000 Brothers, who help in running over 1,100 education centers in 80 countries with more than a million students, together with 90,000 teachers and lay associates.

Short "one-line" prayers are recited in Lasallian educational institutions during the school day, Typical wordings of some are:
Let us remember that we are in the holy presence of God.
Live Jesus in our hearts! Forever!
Saint  de La Salle, pray for us.
The US-based La Salle International Foundation, which supports global educational and other networks of the De La Salle Brothers, say on their Web site that they sponsor educational projects and support schools in 80 countries; and that they give special attention to youth at risk, including those "educationally excluded, street children, orphans, victims of child abuse, drug addicts, disabled youth, individuals with mental illness, migrant and refugee youth, HIV+ and AIDS children, child victims of war, juvenile offenders, child laborers, victims of child trafficking, ethnic minorities, disadvantaged girls, and impoverished children".

Since the 1980s increasing numbers of cases of sexual and physical abuse of children, covered up by authorities, in institutions of the Catholic Church and others have been reported. Cases of physical and sexual abuse of children in Lasallian educational institutions, and failure to investigate, report, and subsequently protect children have been investigated, admitted, and apologised for.

Africa

Benin
Collège Mgr Steinmetz

Burkina Faso
Collège De La Salle, in Ouagadougou
Collège Lasallien Badenya, in Ouagadougou
Collège de Tounouma Bobo Dioulasso
Collège Saint Jean-Baptiste De La Salle Kiri Bobo Dioulasso
Collège Lasallien de Kongoussi
Centre Lasallien d'Initiation aux Métiers d'Agriculture (CLIMA), in Beregadougou
Collège Pierre Kula, in Diebougou
Collège Charles Lwanga, in Nouna

Democratic Republic of the Congo
Collège De La Salle and Saint Georges in Kinshasa
Collège Ntetembwa in Matadi
Bosawa, Liboke Moko, and Liziba primary schools, plus Institut Frère Iloo in Mbandaka
Tumba Kunda dia Zayi in Tumba

Egypt
Collège de la Salle in Daher, Cairo
Collège des Frères (Bab al-Louq), in Cairo
Collège Saint Gabriel in Alexandria
Collège Saint Joseph in Khoronfish, Cairo
Collège Saint Marc in Alexandria
Collège Saint Paul in Shobra, Cairo

Eritrea
 Saint Joseph School, Karen
 Hagaz Agricultural and technology school, Hagaz Eritrea

Ethiopia
 St. Joseph School (Addis Ababa)
 St. Joseph School (Adama)
 Bisrate-Gabriel School (Dire Dawa)
 Meki Catholic School (Meki)

Kenya
 La Salle Catholic Primary School, Nairobi
 Christ the Teacher Institute for Education, Nairobi
 Saint Mary's Boys High School, Nyeri
 Saint Paul School, Marsabit
 Bishop Ndingi Mwangaza Collège, Nakuru
 Child Discovery Center, Nakuru
 Rongai Agricultural and Technical School, Rongai

Madagascar

Collège Saint-Louis-de-Gonzague, Ambositra
Collège Saint-Joseph, Ambatondrazaka
Collège Saint-Jean, Antalaha
Lycée Stella Maris, Toamasina
Institution Sainte Famille (Mahamasina), Antananarivo
École Saint-Joseph (Andohalo), Antananarivo
École Louis Rafiringa (Faravohitra), Antananarivo
Centre de Promotion rurale (CPR), Ambositra

Mozambique
 Escola Joao XXIII, Beira, Sofala

Niger
 L.E.P. Issa Béri in Niamey

Nigeria
 De La Salle Middle School, Ondo State
 Mount De La Salle College, Naka, Makurdi, Benue State

Rwanda
 Académie De La Salle in Byumba
 École d’Art in Gisenyi

Senegal
 Collège Saint Charles Lwanga, Ziguinchor

South Africa
De La Salle Holy Cross College in Johannesburg
La Salle College in Roodepoort

Asia

Hong Kong
St. Joseph's College, in Hong Kong Island
La Salle College, Kowloon
La Salle Primary School, Kowloon
De La Salle Secondary School, N.T., in Sheung Shui
St. Joseph's Primary School
Chan Sui Ki (La Salle) College, in Homantin, Kowloon
Chong Gene Hang College, in Chai Wan
Chan Sui Ki Primary School, in Homantin, Kowloon

India
St.La Salle Hr.Sec School, in Tuticorin.
St.Joseph Hr.Sec.School, in Sooranam, Sivagangai
Boys Town ITI, Madurai
Arul Thendral, Aspirancy, in Madurai
S.Joseph.Juniorate, in Tuticorin
St.Pauls Higher Secondary School, in Montfort Hill, Aizawl

Indonesia
De La Salle Catholic University, in Manado

Israel and Palestine

Israel
Collège des Frères, in Haifa
Collège des Frères, in Jaffa
Collège des Frères, in Nazareth

Jerusalem
 Collège des Frères, in the Old City of Jerusalem
 Collège des Frères, in the Beit Hanina suburb of East Jerusalem

West Bank
Bethlehem University
Collège Des Frères, Bethlehem

Japan
Hakodate La Salle High School
La Salle High School (Kagoshima, Japan)

Jordan
De La Salle Frere, in Amman

Lebanon
 Collège de La Salle, Kfayachit, Zgharta
 Collège Mont La Salle, Ain Saadeh
 Collège des Frères, Tripoli, Dedeh-Koura
 Collège du Sacré-Cœur, Gemmayzé, Beirut
 Collège Notre-Dame, Furn el Chebback, Beirut
 École Saint-Pierre, Baskinta
 Ecole Saint Vincent de Paul, Bourj Hammoud, Beirut

Malaysia
 La Salle Chinese Primary School, Brickfields, Kuala Lumpur
 La Salle School, Brickfields, Kuala Lumpur
 La Salle School, Ipoh Garden, Ipoh, Perak
 La Salle School, Jinjang, Kuala Lumpur
 La Salle School, Klang
 La Salle School, Kota Kinabalu
 La Salle School, Peel Road, Kuala Lumpur
 La Salle School, Penang Formerly on the site of SJK (C) Shang Wu, a Chinese Christian school
 La Salle School, Petaling Jaya
 La Salle School, Sentul, Kuala Lumpur
 St. Andrew's Secondary School (Muar, Johor)
 St. Anthony's School, Teluk Intan, Perak
 St. Francis Institution, Melaka
 St. George's Institution, Taiping, Perak
 St. John's Institution, Kuala Lumpur
 St. Joseph's Institution International School Malaysia, Petaling Jaya
 St. Joseph's Secondary School in Kuching, Sarawak
 St. Martin's School in Tambunan, Sabah
 St. Mary's Secondary School in Sandakan, Sabah
 St. Michael's Institution, Ipoh, Perak
 St. Paul's Institution, Seremban
 St. Theresa Chinese Primary School, Brickfields, Kuala Lumpur
 St. Theresa Padungan Primary School in Kuching, Sarawak
 St. Theresa Primary School in Kuching, Sarawak
 St. Theresa Secondary School in Kuching, Sarawak
 St. Xavier's Institution, Penang
 Sacred Heart Secondary School in Sibu, Sarawak
(Note: The Lasallian Education Mission in Malaysia cites 44 schools in total)

Myanmar
Former Lasallian schools; no longer affiliated
St Peter's High School, Mandalay
St. Patrick's High School, Mawlamyaing
St. Paul's English High School, Yangon

Pakistan
 La Salle High School Faisalabad
La Salle High School Multan

Philippines

De La Salle University - Manila
De La Salle University - Annex / Canlubang
De La Salle University - Dasmarinas
La Salle University - Ozamiz
De La Salle Araneta University
University of St. La Salle - Bacolod City
De La Salle-College of Saint Benilde
De La Salle Medical and Health Sciences Institute
De La Salle Lipa - Batangas
De La Salle John Bosco College - Bislig City
De La Salle Andres Soriano Memorial College - Cebu 
La Salle College - Antipolo
La Salle Academy - Iligan City
St. Joseph School - La Salle - Bacolod City
De La Salle Santiago Zobel School - Alabang 
La Salle Green Hills - Mandaluyong
Jaime Hilario Integrated School - La Salle
St. Benilde School - Bacolod
 De La Salle Supervised Schools, a network of Lasallian private schools
St. Edward Integrated School - Cavite
Academy of Saint John
Escuela de Nuestra Señora de La Salette
Jesus the Risen Savior School
San Lorenzo Academy
Our Lady of the Holy Rosary School
Children of Mary Immaculate College
School of Saint Brother Benilde
Our Lady of Fatima Academy
St. Stephen's Academy
Vincentian Catholic Academy
The Lewis College
San Benildo Integrated School - Baliuag
San Lorenzo Ruiz Formation and Learning Center
Fr. Fay Francis Catholic School
St. John Integrated School
College of San Benildo-Rizal
St. Francis Academy - De La Salle Supervised
Lilyrose School - De La Salle
Our Lady of Mount Carmel Learning Center
College of St. John-Roxas
Leonides S. Virata Memorial School
La Salle College-Victorias
Beula Technical School - Palawan
Scola Guadalupana
St. Francis of Assisi School
St. Dominic Savio Learning Center
St. Michael Academy 
LIDE Learning Center, Inc. (Isabel, Leyte)
DMC-College Foundation
Maryknoll High School of Lambajon
San Benildo Integrated School (Opol, Misamis Oriental)
Rizal Special Education Learning Center
Holy Family School

Singapore
De La Salle School
LASALLE College of the Arts
Saint Anthony's Primary School
Saint Joseph's Institution
Saint Joseph's Institution International School
Saint Joseph's Institution Junior (formerly Saint Michael's School)
Saint Patrick's School
Saint Stephen's School

Sri Lanka
De La Salle College, Mutwal
St. Anne's College, Kurunegala
St. Anthony's College, Wattala
St. Benedict's College, Kotahena
St. Joseph's College, Grandpass
St. Joseph's Preschool, Mutwal
St. Mary's College, Chilaw
St. Sebastian's College, Moratuwa
St. Xavier's Boys' College, Mannar
De Mazenod College, Kandana
Diyagala Boys' Town, Ragama

Thailand
 La Salle Chotiravi Nakhonsawan School
La Salle School Bangkok
La Salle Chanthaburi (Mandapitak) School

Vietnam
In 1975, all of the La Salle schools in Việt Nam were dissolved. In the following year the École Taberd was taken over by the Vietnamese Ministry of Education and transformed into a secondary school becaming the Trần Đại Nghĩa Specialist High School for gifted students in 2000.
Institution La Salle-Taberd, Saigon

Europe

Austria
Vienna
De La Salle Strebersdorf
De La Salle Währing
De La Salle Marianum
De La Salle Fünfhaus

Belgium
Communauté Éducative Saint-Jean-Baptiste in Tamines
Institut Notre-Dame Beauraing-Gedinne in Beauraing
Institut Saint-Joseph in Carlsbourg
Institut Saint-Joseph in Châtelet
ISJBDLS - Institut saint Jean Baptiste de La Salle in Brussels
Sint-Jorisinstituut in Bazel
Sint-Jansschool in Leuven
Technisch Instituut Sint-Jozef in Bilzen
Moretus-Ekeren in Ekeren (Antwerp)
Sint-Jozefinstituut in Genk
Kunsthumaniora Sint-Lucas in Ghent
De Pleinschool Leiekant in Kortrijk
De Pleinschool Groeningekant in Kortrijk
De Pleinschool Broelkant in Kortrijk
VISO in Mariakerke, Ghent
Instituut Onze-Lieve-Vrouw-van-Vreugde in Roeselare
Sint-Lukaskunsthumaniora in Schaerbeek
KCST in Sint-Truiden
Tuinbouwschool Scholengroep O.-L.-Vrouw in Sint-Truiden
Sint-Jozefsinstituut in Ternat
Zaventems Vrij Onderwijs (ZAVO) in Zaventem
Sint-Aloysius Scholengroep O.-L.-Vrouw in Zepperen

France
In France, the Brothers of the Christian schools run 68 primary schools, 92 middle schools, 53 general high schools and 47 vocational high schools, including:
Institut polytechnique LaSalle Beauvais, engineering school
Institution Saint-Jean-Baptiste de la Salle (Avignon)
 (Lorient)
Pensionnat Jean-Baptiste-de-La-Salle (Rouen)
Unilasalle, Beauvais
Institution Saint-Joseph (Toulouse)
Collège & Lycée le Likès (Quimper)

Greece
College De La Salle, in Pefka, Thessaloniki
Saint George De La Salle, in Syros Island, Cyclades
Saint-Paul De La Salle, in Alimos, Attiki
Collège Gréco-Français "Saint-Paul", in Piraeus, Attiki

Hungary
Österreichisch-Ungarische Europaschule, Budapest

Ireland
De La Salle College Churchtown, Dublin
De La Salle College Dundalk, County Louth
De La Salle College Waterford, County Waterford
De La Salle College Macroom, Cork
Beneavin De La Salle college, in Finglas, Dublin
Presentation De La Salle College, in Muine Bheag, County Carlow
 St Fachtna's De La Salle College, in Skibbereen, County Cork
St. Joseph's De La Salle College Wicklow, County Wicklow
St John's College De La Salle, Ballyfermot, Dublin
St Gerald's College Castlebar, County Mayo

Italy
Istituto S. Giuseppe Demerode, in Rome
Istituto Gonzaga Milano
Istituto Pio XII In Rome

Jersey
De La Salle College

Malta
De La Salle College, in Cottonera
Stella Maris College, in Gżira
St. Benild, in Sliema

Poland
Szkoła im. św. Jana de La Salle, in Gdańsk
Szkoła im. św. Jana de La Salle, in Częstochowa

Slovakia
Spojená škola De La Salle, in Bratislava

Spain
Colegio La Salle Alcoi, in Alicante
Irungo La Salle, in Irun
Colegio La Salle, in Córdoba
Colegio La Salle Paterna, in Valencia
Colegio La Salle Paterna Profesional, in Valencia
Colegio La Salle, in Valladolid
Colegio Inmaculada Concepción La Salle, in Andújar
La Salle Barcelona, in Barcelona
La Salle Bonanova, in Barcelona
La Salle Gràcia, in Barcelona
La Salle Guadalupe de Plasencia, in Cáceres
La Salle Horta, in Barcelona
La Salle Inca, in Mallorca
La Salle Manacor, in Mallorca
La Salle Manlleu, in Barcelona
La Salle Mollerussa, in Lleida
La Salle Palma, in Mallorca
La Salle Palamós, in Girona
La Salle Pont d'Inca, in Mallorca
La Salle Premià de Mar, in Barcelona
La Salle Reus, in Tarragona
La Salle Sant Celoni, in Barcelona
La Salle Talavera, in Toledo
La Salle Tarragona, in Tarragona
La Salle Torreforta, in Tarragona

Turkey
Saint Joseph Fransız Lisesi, Istanbul
Saint Michel Fransız Lisesi, Istanbul
Saint Joseph Fransız Lisesi, Izmir

United Kingdom
The former De La Salle Academy, Liverpool is now Dixons Croxteth Academy (no formal faith affiliation)
De La Salle Boys' Home, Rubane House, Kircubbin, County Down, Northern Ireland. Closed 1985, site now Echlinville Distillery.
De La Salle College, in Belfast, Northern Ireland
De La Salle High School, in Downpatrick, Northern Ireland
De La Salle School, in Basildon, Essex
De La Salle School, in St. Helens, Merseyside
The former De La Salle College, Sheffield (until 1976) is now All Saints Catholic High School, Sheffield
The former building of De La Salle College of Higher Education, Middleton, is part of Hopwood Hall College
The former De La Salle College, Salford merged into Pendleton College in 1997
St Aloysius' College in Islington
St Gilbert's, former approved school, Hartlebury, Worcestershire
St John's College, Southsea, Portsmouth (Now Closed)
St Joseph's College in Upper Norwood, London
St. Joseph's College, Ipswich
St. Joseph's Industrial School, in Tranent
St Matthew Academy, Blackheath
St Patrick's Grammar School, Downpatrick, Northern Ireland
St Peter's Catholic School, Bournemouth
Cardinal Langley RC High School, Middleton, Greater Manchester

North and Central America

Canada
De La Salle College, in Deer Park, Toronto, Ontario
Senator O'Connor College School, in North York, Toronto, Ontario

Costa Rica
La Salle School and College, in San José

Cuba
Colegio de La Salle, Vedado, Havana,
Colegio de La Salle, Miramar, Havana
Academia de La Salle, Havana
Colegio de La Salle, Marianao, Havana

Dominican Republic
Colegio Dominicano De La Salle, in Santo Domingo
Escuela/Liceo San Juan Bautista De La Salle, in Santo Domingo (Barrio Simón Bolívar)
Instituto San Juan Bautista De La Salle, Santo Domingo
Colegio De La Salle, in Santiago de los Caballeros
Escuela/Liceo Santo Hermano Miguel, in Santiago de los Caballeros (Barrio Mejoramiento Social)
Escuela/Liceo Juan XXIII, in Higuey
Escuela San Juan Bautista De La Salle, in Higuey (Barrio La Florida)

Honduras
Instituto Experimental La Salle, in San Pedro Sula

Mexico
Centro de Formación Integral La Salle, Tijuana, Baja California
Colegio Benavente, in Puebla, Puebla
Colegio La Salle de Puebla
Colegio Régis La Salle, in Hermosillo, Sonora
Escuela San Juan Bautista De La Salle, in Hermosillo, Sonora
Instituto La Salle, Ciudad Obregón, Sonora
Colegio Guadiana, in Durango, Durango
Instituto Francés de la Laguna, in Gómez Palacio, Durango
Instituto Regiomontano, in Monterrey, Nuevo León
Chepevera campus
Cumbres campus
Colegio Regiomontano Country, in Monterrey, Nuevo León
Colegio Francisco G. Sada, in San Nicolás de los Garza, Nuevo León
Colegio Ignacio Zaragoza (CIZ) La Salle, in Saltillo, Coahuila
Colegio La Salle, in Monclova, Coahuila
Preparatoria La Salle Torreón Torreón, Coahuila
Colegio José de Escandón La Salle, in Ciudad Victoria, Tamaulipas
Colegio de La Salle, in Matamoros, Tamaulipas
Colegio Cristóbal Colón, Estado de México
Colegio Simón Bolívar, in Ciudad de México
Escuela Cristóbal Colón, in Ciudad de México
Colegio La Salle Oaxaca
Instituto La Salle de Chihuahua
Colegio Francisco Febrés Cordero, in Guadalajara, Jalisco
Colegio Vasco de Quiroga, in La Piedad, Michoacán
Colegio La Salle, in Acapulco, Guerrero
Colegio La Salle de Veracruz
Universidad La Salle
Universidad de La Salle Bajío, León, Guanajuato
Universidad La Salle Cancun, Quintana Roo
Universidad La Salle Chihuahua
Universidad La Salle Cuernavaca, Morelos
Universidad La Salle, Mexico City
Universidad La Salle, Morelia, Michoacán
Universidad La Salle Nezahualcóyotl, Estado de México
Universidad La Salle Noroeste, Ciudad Obregón, Sonora
Universidad La Salle Oaxaca
Universidad La Salle Victoria, Tamaulipas
Universidad La Salle Pachuca, Hidalgo
Universidad La Salle Laguna, in Gómez Palacio, Durango
Universidad La Salle-Benavente, in Puebla, Puebla
Universidad La Salle Saltillo, Coahuila

Nicaragua
Instituto Pedagógico La Salle, in Managua
 Escuela Monseñor Lezcano, in Managua
Colegio La Salle, in León
Universidad Tecnológica La Salle, in León
Instituto Politécnico La Salle, in León
Escuela La Salle, in León
Colegio La Salle, in Jinotega

Panama
Colegio De La Salle, in Panama City
Colegio San José De La Salle, in Colón
Colegio La Salle (de Margarita), in Colón
Colegio San Miguel Febres Cordero, in Los Lagos, Colón

United States

Arizona
San Miguel High School (Tucson, Arizona)

California
Cathedral High School, in Los Angeles
Christian Brothers High School in Sacramento
Cristo Rey De La Salle East Bay High School, in Oakland
De La Salle Academy, in Concord
De La Salle High School, Concord
De Marillac Academy, in San Francisco
Justin-Siena High School, in Napa
La Salle College Preparatory (formerly known as La Salle High School) in Pasadena, California
Sacred Heart Cathedral Preparatory in San Francisco
Saint Mary's College High School, in Berkeley
Saint Mary's College of California, in Moraga

Colorado
J. K. Mullen High School, in Denver

District of Columbia
St. John's College High School, in Washington, D.C.

Florida
Saint John Paul II Academy in Boca Raton
La Salle Education Center in Homestead

Illinois
De La Salle Institute, in Chicago
Christian Brothers of the Midwest in Chicago
Lewis University, in Romeoville
Montini Catholic High School in Lombard
Resurrection College Prep High School, in Chicago
St. Patrick High School, in Chicago

Louisiana
De La Salle High School, in New Orleans
Christian Brothers School, in New Orleans
St. Benilde School, in Metairie
St. Paul's School, in Covington
Archbishop Rummel High School, in Metairie
An institution calling itself LaSalle University in Mandeville was a diploma mill with no connection to the De La Salle Brothers

Maryland
Bishop Walsh School, in Cumberland (Allegheny County)
Cardinal Gibbons School (formerly Cardinal Gibbons High School). Run by the Lasallians 2001–2010.
Calvert Hall College High School, founded 1845 in downtown Baltimore, later relocated in 1960 to Towson

Michigan
De La Salle Collegiate High School, in Warren

Minnesota
DeLaSalle High School, in Minneapolis
Benilde-St. Margaret's School – St Louis Park
Cretin-Derham Hall High School, in St. Paul
Holy Family Catholic High School, in Victoria
Saint Mary's University of Minnesota, in Winona
Totino-Grace High School, in Fridley

Missouri
De La Salle Middle School, St. Louis (since 2014 operates as the public non-Catholic charter "La Salle Middle School")
La Salle Institute, Glencoe
Christian Brothers College High School, in St. Louis
Helias High School, Jefferson City

Montana
De La Salle Blackfeet School, Browning

Nebraska
Roncalli Catholic High School, in Omaha

New Jersey
Christian Brothers Academy in Lincroft
Hudson Catholic Regional High School, in Jersey City
Queen of Peace High School, in North Arlington. Closed in 2017.

New Mexico
College of Santa Fe (1966-2009) (previously St. Michael's College (1859–1966); subsequently the non-Lasallian Santa Fe University of Art and Design from 2010–2018), now closed
St. Michael's High School

New York
La Salle School, in Albany
The De La Salle School, in Freeport
La Salle Academy, in New York City
La Salle Institute, in Troy
Christian Brothers Academy, in Syracuse
Christian Brothers Academy, in Albany
St. Joseph's Collegiate Institute, in Buffalo
St. Peter's Boys High School, in Staten Island
St. Raymond High School for Boys, in The Bronx
Bishop Loughlin Memorial High School, in Brooklyn
Martin Deporres Alternative School System in, Queens/Brooklyn
Manhattan College, in The Bronx

Ohio
La Salle High School, in Cincinnati

Oklahoma
Bishop Kelley High School, in Tulsa
 San Miguel School in Tulsa

Oregon
De La Salle North Catholic High School, in Portland
La Salle High School, in Milwaukie

Pennsylvania
Central Catholic High School, in Pittsburgh
La Salle Academy, in Philadelphia
La Salle College High School, in Wyndmoor
La Salle University in Philadelphia
Saint Gabriel's System, including St Gabriel's Hall and De La Salle Vocational, for court-adjudicated youth, Philadelphia
Saint Thomas College, Scranton. Administered by the Lasallians 1897–1942, then transferred to the Jesuits. Renamed The University of Scranton in 1938
West Catholic Preparatory High School, in Philadelphia

Puerto Rico
Colegio de la Salle, in Bayamón
Colegio de la Salle, in Añasco

Rhode Island
La Salle Academy, in Providence
St. Raphael Academy, in Pawtucket

Tennessee
Christian Brothers High School, in Memphis
Christian Brothers University, in Memphis

Texas
Cathedral High School, in El Paso

Washington
La Salle High School, in Union Gap

Wisconsin
Roncalli High School, in Manitowoc

Oceania

Australia
De La Salle College, Ashfield, in Sydney, New South Wales
De La Salle College, Caringbah, in Sydney, New South Wales
De La Salle College, Cronulla, in Sydney, New South Wales
De La Salle College, Malvern, in Melbourne, Victoria
De La Salle College, Revesby Heights, in Sydney, New South Wales
James Sheahan Catholic High School, in Orange, New South Wales
LaSalle Catholic College, Bankstown, in Sydney, New South Wales
Oakhill College, in Castle Hill, Sydney, New South Wales
Saint Michael's College, in Adelaide, South Australia
Saint James College, in East Bentleigh, Victoria

Former Lasallian schools in Australia
BoysTown , Queensland; a residential school for disadvantaged boys administered by the De La Salle brothers 1961–2001
De La Salle College Coogee, Sydney, New South Wales (1946–1963)
De La Salle College Cootamundra, New South Wales (1913–1977)
De La Salle College, Orange, New South Wales (1928–1977)

New Zealand
De La Salle College, in Mangere East, Auckland
Francis Douglas Memorial College in New Plymouth
John Paul College in Rotorua

Papua New Guinea
De La Salle High School, Bomana, near Port Moresby
Lasalle Technical College – Hohola (Formerly HYDC), Port Moresby
Jubilee Catholic Secondary School, Port Moresby
Sacred Heart Teachers College, Bomana
Mainohana Catholic High School, Bereina

South America

Argentina
La Salle Buenos Aires, in Buenos Aires City
La Salle Florida, in Buenos Aires Province
La Salle San Martín, in Buenos Aires Province
San Juan Bautista De La Salle Pilar, in Buenos Aires Province
Santo Tomás de Aquino, in González Catán, Buenos Aires Province
San Martín de Porres, in José León Suárez, Buenos Aires Province
Casa Joven, in González Catán, Buenos Aires Province
La Salle Paraná, Provincia de Entre Ríos
Escuela Niño Jesús, in San Martín
La Salle Pigüé
La Salle Argüello, in Córdoba
San José, in Villa del Rosario
La Salle San Héctor Valdivielso, Malvinas Argentinas, Córdoba
La Salle Rosario, Santa Fé
La Salle Jobson, in Santa Fé, Santa Fé

Bolivia
Colegio La Salle, in La Paz
Colegio La Salle, in Santa Cruz
Colegio La Salle, in Cochabamba
Colegio La Salle, in Tarija
Colegio La Salle, in Beni
Colegio La Salle, in Pando
Colegio La Salle, in Oruro
Universidad La Salle, in La Paz

Brazil
Colegio La Salle in Canoas (State: Rio Grande do Sul)
Colegio La Salle in Carazinho (State: Rio Grande do Sul)
Colegio La Salle Carmo in Caxias do Sul (State: Rio Grande do Sul)
Colegio La Salle in Caxias do Sul (State: Rio Grande do Sul)
Colegio La Salle in Dores (State: Rio Grande do Sul)
Colegio La Salle in Esmeralda (State: Rio Grande do Sul)
Colegio La Salle in Esteio (State: Rio Grande do Sul)
Colegio La Salle in Hipólito Leite (State: Rio Grande do Sul)
Colegio La Salle in Medianeira (State: Rio Grande do Sul)
Colegio La Salle in Pão dos Pobres (State: Rio Grande do Sul)
Colegio La Salle in Santo Antônio (State: Rio Grande do Sul)
Colegio La Salle in São João (State: Rio Grande do Sul)
Colegio La Salle in Sapucaia (State: Rio Grande do Sul)
Unilasalle in Canoas (State: Rio Grande do Sul)
Faculdade La Salle in Estrela (State: Rio Grande do Sul)
Colegio La Salle in Peperi (State: Santa Catarina)
Colegio La Salle in Xanxerê (State: Santa Catarina)
Colegio La Salle in Pato Branco (State: Parana)
Colegio La Salle in Toledo (State: Parana)
Colegio La Salle in Curitiba (State: Parana)
Colegio La Salle in Brasília (Distrito Federal)
Colegio La Salle in Águas Claras (Distrito Federal)
Colegio La Salle in Núcleo Bandeirante (Distrito Federal)
Colegio La Salle in Sobradinho (Distrito Federal)
Colegio La Salle in Lucas do Rio Verde (State: Mato Grosso)
Faculdade La Salle in Lucas do Rio Verde (State: Mato Grosso)
Colegio La Salle in Rondonópolis (State: Mato Grosso)
Faculdade La Salle in Lucas (State: Mato Grosso)
Colegio La Salle in Botucatu (State: São Paulo)
Colegio La Salle in São Carlos (State: São Paulo)
Colegio La Salle in São Paulo (State: São Paulo)
Colegio La Salle in Niterói (State: Rio de Janeiro)
Colegio Instituto ABEL in Niterói (State: Rio de Janeiro)
Unilasalle in Niterói (State: Rio de Janeiro)
Colegio La Salle in Manaus (State: Amazonas)
Faculdade La Salle in Manaus (State: Amazonas)
Colegio La Salle in Augustinópolis (State: Tocantins)

Chile
Colegio La Salle, in Santiago
Colegio San Gregorio de La Salle, in Santiago
Escuela San Lázaro, in Santiago
Instituto La Salle, in Santiago
Colegio La Salle, in Talca
Colegio La Salle, in Temuco
Escuela Francia, in Temuco

Colombia
Institución Educativa Nacional Dante Alighieri, San Vicente del Caguán
Colegio San José de La Salle (first Lasallian school in Colombia, 1890), in Medellín
 Colegio De La Salle, in Cúcuta
Colegio De La Salle, in Cartagena
Colegio Bifi La Salle, in Barranquilla
Instituto La Salle, in Barranquilla
Colegio De San Carlos, in Medellín
Colegio De La Salle, in Montería
Colegio De La Salle, in Pereira
Colegio De La Salle, in Bucaramanga
Colegio De La Salle, in Villavicencio
Colegio De La Salle, in Orocue
Colegio De La Salle, in Bogotá
Colegio De La Salle, in Bello
Colegio De La Salle, in Envigado
Colegio San Carlos, in Medellín
Universidad Lasallista, in Caldas
Colegio La Salle De Bello, in Bello
I.E.D. La Salle, in Zipaquirá
Instituto Tecnico Central, in Bogotá
Liceo Hermano Miguel, in Bogotá
Academia La Salle San Benildo, in Bogotá
Universidad de La Salle, in Bogotá
San José de la Salle school Medellín
Instituto Politécnico Álvaro Gonzalez Santana, in Sogamoso

Ecuador
Unidad Educativa La Salle, in Conocoto, Municipality of Quito
Unidad Educativa San José – La Salle, in Guayaquil
Unidad Educativa San-Jose La Salle, in Latacunga
Unidad Educativa Francisco Febres Cordero La Salle, Quito
Unidad Educativa Santo Hermano Miguel La Salle, Quito
Unidad Educativa San Alfonso del Hierro La Salle, Quito
Unidad Educativa El Cebolllar La Salle, Quito

Paraguay
Escuela Jose Maria Bogarin, Santisima Trinidad, Asunción
San Isidro Labrador, Pozo Colorado.
Instituto de Formación Docente Diocesano, Capiibary

Perú
Colegio La Salle in Lima
Colegio "Fe y Alegría" Nº 43 in Lima
Colegio Hno. Noe Zevallos Ortega in Lima
Colegio De La Salle in Arequipa
C.E.E. San Juan Bautista De La Salle in Arequipa
C.E.P. San José - La Salle Cusco
Instituto Superior Tecnológico Pedagógico. La Salle - Urubamba, Cusco
Instituto Superior Pedagógico Público, Loreto, Iquitos
Instituto Superior Pedagógico "Fray Lorenzo Pascual Alegre", Requena, Iquitos
Instituto Superior Tecnológico "Manos Unidas", Requena, Iquitos
Centro Educativo Ocupacional "Manos Unidas", Requena, Iquitos
Centro Educativo Primario - Secundario Mixto (Anexo Al I.S.P.), Requena, Iquitos

Venezuela
Colegio La Salle La Colina, in Caracas
Colegio La Salle Tienda Honda, in Caracas
Colegio La Salle Guaparo, in Valencia
Colegio La Salle Los Taladros, in Valencia
Colegio La Salle, in Barquisimeto
Unidad Educativa Colegio Pre-artesanal Hermano Juan, in Barquisimeto
Colegio La Salle, in Mérida
E.T.I. Fundación La Salle, in San Félix
IUTMAR, in Punta de Piedras
Colegio San Jose La Salle, in Puerto Cabello, Carabobo
U.E. Felicita Baloche, in Puerto Cabello, Carabobo

Sexual abuse cases

There have been a number of cases of institutional sexual and physical abuse of children, many over a period of several decades, in Lasallian educational institutions in several countries. Some branches of the De La Salle Brothers admitted to these cases, and issued apologies publicly and to victims. The Northern Ireland Historical Institutional Abuse Inquiry in its report on physical and sexual abuse at the De La Salle Boys' Home at Rubane House considered "the extent and frequency of the abuse was such that it was systemic" and that "the [La Salle] Order's failings to properly investigate allegations of sexual abuse and to properly report them to relevant authorities and its failure to take proper steps to protect children from further sexual abuse" amounted to "a systemic failure to take appropriate steps to ensure the investigation and prosecution of criminal offences involving abuse".

On 11 March 2022 ministers from the five main political parties in Northern Ireland and six abusing institutions made statements of apology in the Northern Ireland Assembly.

The six institutions that apologised for carrying out abuse were De La Salle Brothers, represented by Br Francis Manning; the Sisters of Nazareth, represented bySr Cornelia Walsh; the Sisters of St Louis represented by Sr Uainin Clarke; theGood Shepherd Sisters, represented by Sr Cait O'Leary; Barnardo's in Northern Ireland, represented by Michele Janes; and Irish Church Missions, represented by Rev Mark Jones. In live reporting after the apology, BBC News reported that Jon McCourt from Survivors North West said "If what happened today was the best that the church could offer by way of an apology they failed miserably. There was no emotion, there was no ownership. ... I don't believe that the church and institutions atoned today." He called on the intuitions to "do the right thing" and contribute to the redress fund for survivors, saying that institutions have done similar for people in Scotland. McCourt praised the government ministers' apologies; they had "sat and thought out and listened to what it was we said.", but said that the institutions had failed to do this, leading to some victims having to leave the room while they were speaking, "compound[ing] the hurt." Others angry at the institutions' apologies included Caroline Farry, who attended St Joseph's Training School in Middletown from 1978 to 1981,  overseen by nuns from the Sisters of St Louis, Pádraigín Drinan from Survivors of Abuse, and Alice Harper, whose brother, a victim of the De La Salle Brothers, had since died. Peter Murdock, from campaign group Savia, was at Nazareth Lodge Orphanage with his brother (who had recently died); he likened the institution to an "SS camp". He said "It's shocking to hear a nun from the institution apologising ... it comes 30 years too late ... people need to realise that it has to come from the heart. They say it came from the heart but why did they not apologise 30 years ago?"

Notes

References

 
Lists of Catholic schools